A Different Universe: Reinventing Physics from the Bottom Down is a 2005 physics book by Robert B. Laughlin, a winner of the Nobel Prize in Physics for the fractional quantum Hall effect. Its title is a play on the P. W. Anderson manifesto More is Different, historically important in claiming that condensed-matter physics deserves greater respect. The book extends his articles The Middle Way and The Theory of Everything, arguing the limits of reductionism. A key concept in Laughlin's works is protectorates, meaning robust physical regimes of behavior that do not depend on (that is, they are protected from the fickle details of) the underlying smaller-scale physics such as quantum noise. Such robust or reliable behavior at macroscopic scales makes possible higher-level entities, from biological life to nanotechnology. The book emphasizes more study of such macroscopic phenomena, sometimes called emergence, over the ever-downward dive into theoretically fundamental ideas such as string theory, which at some point become empirically irrelevant by having no observable consequences in our world. The arguments come full circle with modern dark energy ideas suggesting that spacetime or the vacuum may not be empty, but rather (for all we can observe) a medium, a possibility ironically glimpsed even by Einstein whose career began with demolishing the similar but too-simplistic notion of ether with his special relativity work.

References

Physics books
2005 non-fiction books